The Rakaia Gorge is located on the Rakaia River in inland Canterbury in New Zealand's South Island.

Like its neighbour, the Waimakariri River, the Rakaia runs through wide shingle beds for much of its length, but is forced through a narrow canyon as it approaches the Canterbury Plains.

In the 1870s, there were proposals to extend the Whitecliffs Branch railway into the Rakaia Gorge, and an 1880 Royal Commission on New Zealand's railway network was in favour of this proposal, but it never came to fruition.

The Rakaia Gorge bridge was completed in 1882 and provides an inland alternative to the more frequently used Rakaia River bridge just north of the town of Rakaia. The bridge carries State Highway 77 and the Inland Scenic Route and connects the settlements of Glentunnel and Methven

Swimming at the top bridges of the gorge is a favoured pastime for locals and tourists alike.  Swimming in the main river can be done but only by strong swimmers. There is a perfect swimming hole under the concrete bridge that suits all levels, this area has no current as it is completely protected from the river.

References

External links
 View from Rakaia Gorge Bridge - Google Street View

Canyons and gorges of Canterbury, New Zealand